McLaren Park may refer to:

 John McLaren Park in San Francisco, California, United States
 McLaren Park, New Zealand, an Auckland, New Zealand, suburb